Midnight, in Marvel Comics, may refer to:

 Midnight, another name used by Midnight Sun
 Midnight (Jeff Wilde), a former sidekick and later enemy of Moon Knight

See also
Midnight Sons
Midnight's Fire
Proxima Midnight

References